Sorie Enda Nasution (born 28 August 1958) is an Indonesian weightlifter. He competed in the men's featherweight event at the 1984 Summer Olympics.

References

1958 births
Living people
Indonesian male weightlifters
Olympic weightlifters of Indonesia
Weightlifters at the 1984 Summer Olympics
Place of birth missing (living people)
20th-century Indonesian people